Patrick F. McCauley (June 10, 1870 – January 17, 1917) was a Major League Baseball player. He threw right-handed.

He was born in Ware, Massachusetts and died in Hoboken, New Jersey.

External links

1870 births
1917 deaths
Major League Baseball catchers
New York Highlanders players
Washington Senators (1891–1899) players
St. Louis Browns (NL) players
Baseball players from Massachusetts
19th-century baseball players
Manchester Gazettes players
Lawrence (minor league baseball) players
Portland (minor league baseball) players
Lowell Lowells players
Lowell (minor league baseball) players
Manchester (minor league baseball) players
Boston Reds (minor league) players
Providence Clamdiggers (baseball) players
Providence Grays (minor league) players
Detroit Tigers (Western League) players
Omaha Omahogs players
St. Joseph Saints players
Buffalo Bisons (minor league) players
Columbus Buckeyes (minor league) players
Columbus Senators players
Grand Rapids Furnituremakers players
Worcester Hustlers players
Newark Sailors players
Montreal Royals players
Worcester Riddlers players
Rochester Bronchos players
Jersey City Skeeters players
Wilmington Peaches players
Portsmouth Truckers players
Norfolk Tars players
Bridgeport Orators players